Tarakanda is an upazila of the Mymensingh District in Bangladesh. It lies on the banks of Mara Kharia river.

History
It is estimated that human habitation in this area began between the sixth and twelfth centuries.

Tarakanda was established as a thana on 19 May 1999. In 2012, the Tarakanda Thana was upgraded into an upazila (sub-district), making it Mymensingh District's latest upazila. Prior to this, Tarakanda was a part of the Phulpur Upazila.

Demographics 

At the time of the 2011 census, the upazila's population was 298,220 and was entirely rural. Muslims were 284,763 and Hindus 12,696.

Economy and tourism
The Tarakanda Jami Mosque is a popular mosque. The Tarakanda Bazar is also noted. The Tarakanda Barta, Monthly Kaler Alo, Monthly Nabadiganta and Fortnightly Tarakanda are published here. The economy is mostly agriculturaland the upazila produces a large quantity of fish and vegetables.

Administration
Tarakanda Upazila is divided into ten union parishads: Balikha, Banihala, Biska, Dhakua, Galagaon, Kakni, Kamargaon, Kamaria, Rampur, and Tarakanda.

Upazila Chairmen

Education
In 1929, the Tarakanda Multilateral High School was established. Other notable institutions include Shahid Smrity High School, Galagaon High School, Kakni High School and Kakni Model Academy.

See also
 Upazilas of Bangladesh
 Districts of Bangladesh
 Divisions of Bangladesh

References 

Upazilas of Mymensingh District